This is a list of universities in Colombia.  The Colombian higher education system is composed of technical institutes focused on vocational education, university institutions focused on technological education, and universities focused on undergraduate and postgraduate education. The country has both public and private universities. Most public universities conform to the State University System (SUE), and most departments have at least one public university. Several private universities are affiliated to the Roman Catholic Church or are nonsectarian.

Public

National

Departmental

Private

Catholic
{| style="width:100%;"
 |- style="vertical-align:top;"
 |
 |

Nonsectarian

See also

 List of universities in Bogotá
 Lists of universities and colleges
 Lists of universities and colleges by country
 Pontifical university

References

External links 
 Universities and Higher Education Institutions
 Universities in Colombia by region

 
Universities
Colombia
Colombia